RHB may refer to:

RHB Bank
Rhaetian Railway
Rorschach–Heiden railway, a mountain railway in eastern Switzerland
Right hand bat, see Batting (cricket)